Michael Barrington (3 July 1924 – 5 June 1988) was a British actor best known for his television work. His best remembered role is as the ineffectual Governor Venables in the BBC sitcom Porridge which featured Ronnie Barker in the lead role.

Early life and career
Born in Twickenham, both his parents died when he was 16. His plans to train as a veterinarian were interrupted by Second World War service in a munitions factory and the Royal Engineers. After the war he decided to become an actor and trained at the Birmingham School of Drama. He then appeared in repertory theatres and at the Vaudeville Theatre in Salad Days.

Television appearances
In addition to Porridge Barrington also appeared in; Z-Cars, The Avengers, Private Schulz, Adam Adamant Lives!, and in the Doctor Who story The Seeds of Doom, as Sir Colin Thackeray. He was cast as Sir Robert Peel in the 1975 English miniseries Edward the Seventh. (In the USA this miniseries was renamed Edward the King.)

Personal life and death
He was married to actress Barbara New until his death from a heart attack on 5 June 1988, aged 63 in London, following many years of ill health due to lung disease. He was buried in the East London Cemetery and Crematorium.

Selected filmography
 Payroll (1961) – Hay (uncredited)
 The Hellfire Club (1961) – Footman (uncredited)
 Follow That Man (1961) – Hotel manager
 Privilege (1967) – The Bishop of Essex
 Up the Junction (1968) – Barrister
 The Rise and Rise of Michael Rimmer (1970) – Major Scott
 Follow Me! (1972) – Mr. Scrampton
 The Black Panther (1977)
 The Stud (1978) – Vicar (uncredited)

References

External links
 
 

1924 births
1988 deaths
20th-century English male actors
English male television actors
Male actors from London
British Army personnel of World War II
Royal Engineers soldiers